Katja Maaria Kettu (born Heikkinen, April 10, 1978) is a Finnish contemporary writer and film producer.
She debuted in 2005 with the novel Surujenkerääjä. The book was nominated for the Helsingin-Sanomat literature prize as best debut novel. Her breakthrough as writer succeeded with The Midwife (Kätilö). In the book Kettu describes the love between a Finnish midwife and a German officer during the Second World War. She shows in brutal scenes of birth, abortion and murder how people are able to suffer for love. The story is inspired by the life of Kettu's grandparents.

References

1978 births
Living people
People from Muhos
Finnish dramatists and playwrights
Finnish women dramatists and playwrights
21st-century Finnish novelists
Finnish women novelists
Writers from Northern Ostrobothnia
21st-century Finnish women writers
Finnish film producers
Finnish women film producers